Domenik Hixon (born October 8, 1984) is a former American football wide receiver and return specialist in the National Football League (NFL). He was drafted by the Denver Broncos in the fourth round of the 2006 NFL Draft. He played college football at Akron. He was also a member of New York Giants, with whom he became a two-time Super Bowl winner against the New England Patriots twice, as well as, a member of the Carolina Panthers and the Chicago Bears.

Early years
Hixon was born to an African American father and a German mother. He attended Whitehall-Yearling High School in Whitehall, Ohio and was a letterman in football, basketball, track, and baseball. In basketball, he was named Honorable Mention All-State as a point guard. In track, he cleared 6–5 in the high jump event.

Hixon was a high school teammate of NFL defensive back Keiwan Ratliff.

College career
Hixon was one of Charlie Frye's passing weapons during his first 3 years at Akron.  In the 2005 MAC Championship game, Luke Getsy found Hixon for what would be the game winning 36 yard touchdown pass with 11 seconds remaining in the fourth quarter, earning Akron its first MAC Championship in school history.

Professional career

Denver Broncos
Hixon played 4 games for the Denver Broncos to start the 2007 season then was released in early October. He functioned as the team's starting kick returner. At the start of the second quarter in the first game of the season against the Buffalo Bills, tight end Kevin Everett suffered a serious spinal cord injury while tackling Hixon. Everett had a near-full recovery after a grim prognosis but never played another NFL game.

New York Giants
The New York Giants quickly signed Hixon and soon he took over the main kickoff returning duties. Domenik had one reception for 5 yards against the Minnesota Vikings on November 25. He made his mark by returning a kickoff 74 yards for a touchdown in the Giants' 2007 regular season finale against the undefeated New England Patriots. Hixon's touchdown put the Giants ahead 14–10 in the 2nd quarter, but the Giants lost 38–35.

As the main kickoff returner, Hixon returned 10 kickoffs for an average of 25.3 yards during the Giants' run to Super Bowl XLII. His returns provided the Giants with good field position and helped propel their offense into the end zone on several occasions. He recovered a critical fumble late in the 4th quarter of the NFC Championship game on January 20 at frigid Lambeau Field, a game the Giants eventually won in overtime. Hixon also recorded 2 special teams tackles in the 2007 playoffs.

Hixon later broke out in the Giants second preseason game against the Cleveland Browns, catching two touchdown passes and then returned an 82-yard kickoff for a touchdown, all in the first quarter.

In week 5 of the 2008 season, Hixon was forced to start after Giants wide receiver Plaxico Burress was suspended for breaking team rules.

Hixon would have 4 catches for 102 yards and a touchdown in his first career start. He left the game late in the first half after suffering a concussion.

In Week 14, Hixon would again be placed in the starting role for the rest of the season, due to the suspension of Burress for conduct detrimental to the team after suffering an accidental self-inflicted gunshot wound to his leg.

On June 16, 2010, Hixon suffered a torn ACL at a practice at the Giants' new home in the New Meadowlands, and was pronounced out for the season. He was waived/injured and subsequently placed on the injured reserve list on July 17.

On August 13, 2011, Hixon returned to the team in the New York Giants and Carolina Panthers preseason game.

On week 2 of the 2011 Season, Hixon tore his ACL while making a spectacular bobbling catch in the endzone. He was declared out for the season.

In his career, he's made 31 special teams tackles, caught 63 passes for 838 yards (13.3 avg) and 4 touchdowns, ran 3 times on reverse plays for 18 yards, returned 51 punts for 561 yards and a touchdown and 80 kickoffs for 1,966 yards and a touchdown.

On March 3, 2012, Hixon re-signed with the New York Giants.

Carolina Panthers
At the start of free agency, Hixon reportedly turned down an offer from the Detroit Lions. After receiving interest from the Cleveland Browns and Carolina Panthers, Hixon ultimately agreed to terms on a one-year deal with the Panthers on April 3, 2013. In a week 16 game against the New Orleans Saints, Hixon caught a game winning 14 yard TD pass from Cam Newton to give the Panthers a 17–13 win and give them first place in the NFC South.

Chicago Bears
On March 13, 2014, Hixon signed a one-year contract with the Chicago Bears. On May 27, 2014, during Organized Team Activities (OTAs), he suffered a torn ACL for the third time in his career.

Retirement
On the same day that his injury during the Bears' OTAs was announced, Hixon announced through his Facebook page that he would be retiring from the NFL. On June 3, 2014, the Bears terminated Hixon's contract with an injury settlement.

Charity work
Hixon hosts the Next Level Football Camp, with co-founder Anthony Jordan, which provides underprivileged children in the Columbus, Ohio area with a summer football training program. In the past, the camp has been staffed by current and former NFL players such as Lance Moore, Chase Blackburn, and Gary Joshua.

References

External links
Chicago Bears bio
Carolina Panthers bio

1984 births
Living people
African-American players of American football
American people of German descent
American football wide receivers
American football return specialists
Akron Zips football players
Carolina Panthers players
Chicago Bears players
Denver Broncos players
German players of American football
New York Giants players
People from Kusel (district)
Players of American football from Columbus, Ohio
Sportspeople from Rhineland-Palatinate
21st-century African-American sportspeople
20th-century African-American people